Jorge Manuel Guerreiro Cristóvão (born 5 June 1965) is a retired Portuguese football midfielder.

References

1965 births
Living people
Portuguese footballers
S.C.U. Torreense players
Atlético Clube de Portugal players
Louletano D.C. players
S.C. Olhanense players
F.C. Famalicão players
C.F. Estrela da Amadora players
Leça F.C. players
C.D. Olivais e Moscavide players
Association football midfielders
Primeira Liga players
Portugal youth international footballers
Footballers from Lisbon